Fuat Temel (born 1 March 1951) is a Turkish boxer. He competed in the men's light flyweight event at the 1968 Summer Olympics. At the 1968 Summer Olympics, he lost to Harlan Marbley of the United States.

References

1951 births
Living people
Turkish male boxers
Olympic boxers of Turkey
Boxers at the 1968 Summer Olympics
Sportspeople from Mersin
Light-flyweight boxers